Floods in September 1987 became the deadliest natural disaster in the history of South Africa, with 506 fatalities.

A cut-off low moved across South Africa, fueled by moisture from the southeast. The heavy rainfall ended on September 29. Over three days, Mtunzini recorded  of precipitation. The heaviest rainfall occurred in mountainous areas, causing landslides and flash floods, particularly in rivers. Water levels along the Umgeni River were so high that it washed away an entire island. There were a total of 506 fatalities related to the event. The floods damaged more than 30,000 houses, leaving more than 50,000 people homeless. Damage was estimated at US$500 million. 14 bridges were washed away. The floods destroyed four aqueducts serving the Durban metropolitan area, leaving people without water. Several rural villages were entirely destroyed. The floods also wrecked fields.

After the floods, officials discouraged drinking water due to the contamination of supply, The military airdropped pamphlets to residents how to purify their water.

See also
2022 KwaZulu-Natal floods - deadly floods in 2022

References

1987 floods in Africa
1987 in South Africa
Floods in South Africa
1987 disasters in South Africa